Kruger National Park is a South African National Park and one of the largest game reserves in Africa. The administrative headquarters are in Skukuza. Areas of the park were first protected by the government of the South African Republic in 1898, and it became South Africa's first national park in 1926.

To the west and south of the Kruger National Park are the two South African provinces of Limpopo and Mpumalanga, respectively. To the north is Zimbabwe and to the east is Mozambique. It is now part of the Great Limpopo Transfrontier Park, a peace park that links Kruger National Park with the Gonarezhou National Park in Zimbabwe, and with the Limpopo National Park in Mozambique.

The park is part of the Kruger to Canyons Biosphere, an area designated by the United Nations Educational, Scientific and Cultural Organization (UNESCO) as an International Man and Biosphere Reserve.

The park has nine main gates allowing entrance to the different camps.

History

Pre-reserve (before 1898) 
Over 420 recorded archaeological sites in Kruger Park attest to its occupation before modern times. Most sites however had relatively short occupation periods, as the presence of predators and the tsetse fly limited cattle husbandry. At Masorini hill,  the H9 route, iron smelting was practiced up to the Mfecane era. The reconstructed Thulamela on a hilltop south of the Levuvhu River was occupied from the 13th to 16th centuries and had links with traders from the African east coast.

Before the Second Anglo-Boer War, the area now covered by the park was a remote section of the eastern South African Republic's last wild frontier. Paul Kruger, President of the South African Republic at the time, proclaimed the area, which was inhabited by the Tsonga people, a sanctuary for the protection of its wildlife. James Stevenson Hamilton noted many kraals along the Sabi River and also further north beyond the Letaba River although the north was sparsely populated compared to the south. Many of the local natives were employed by railway companies for the construction of rail connections, notably that between Pretoria (now in South Africa) and Lorenço Marques (now Maputo, Mozambique) during the end of the 19th century. Abel Chapman, one of the hunters who noted that the area was overhunted by the end of the 19th century, brought this fact to wider attention.

Sabi Game Reserve (1898–1926) 
In 1895, Jakob Louis van Wyk introduced in the Volksraad of the South African Republic a motion to create the game reserve. The area proposed extended from the Crocodile River to the Sabi River in the north. That motion, introduced together with another Volksraad member by the name of R. K. Loveday, and accepted for discussion in September 1895 by a majority of one vote, resulted in the proclamation by Paul Kruger, on 26 March 1898, of a "Government Wildlife Park." This park would later be known as the Sabi Game Reserve.

The park was initially created to control hunting, and to protect the diminished number of animals in the park.

James Stevenson-Hamilton became the first warden of the reserve in 1902. The reserve was located in the southern one-third of the modern park. Singwitsi Reserve, named after the Shingwedzi River and now in northern Kruger National Park, was proclaimed in 1903. During the following decades all the native tribes were removed from the reserve and during the 1960s the last were removed at Makuleke in the Pafuri triangle. In 1926, Sabie Game Reserve, the adjacent Shingwedzi Game Reserve, and farms were combined to create Kruger National Park.

During 1923, the first large groups of tourists started visiting the Sabie Game Reserve, but only as part of the South African Railways' popular "Round in Nine" tours. The tourist trains used the Selati railway line between Komatipoort on the Mozambican border and Tzaneen in Limpopo Province. The tour included an overnight stop at Sabie Bridge (now Skukuza) and a short walk, escorted by armed rangers, into the bush. It soon became a highlight of the tour and it gave valuable support for the campaign to proclaim the Sabie Game Reserve as a national park.

Kruger National Park (1926–1946) 
After the proclamation of the Kruger National Park in 1918, the first three tourist cars entered the park in 1927, jumping to 180 cars in 1928 and 850 cars in 1929.Warden James Stevenson-Hamilton retired on 30 April 1946, after 44 years as warden of the Kruger Park and its predecessor, the Sabi Sabi Game Reserve.

1946–1994 

Stevenson-Hamilton was replaced as warden by Colonel J. A. B. Sandenbergh of the South African Air Force.
In 1959, work commenced to completely fence the park's boundaries. Work started on the southern boundary along the Crocodile River and in 1960 the western and northern boundaries were fenced, followed by the eastern boundary with Mozambique. The purpose of the fence was to curb the spread of diseases, facilitate border patrolling and inhibit the movement of poachers.

The Makuleke area in the northern part of the park was forcibly taken from the Makuleke people by the government in 1969 and about 1500 of them were relocated to land to the south so that their original tribal areas could be integrated into the greater Kruger National Park.

1994–present 

The land was given back to the Makuleke people, however, they chose not to resettle on the land but to engage with the private sector to invest in tourism. This resulted in the building of several game lodges from which they earn royalties.

In the late 1990s, the fences between the Kruger Park and Klaserie Game Reserve, Olifants Game Reserve, and Balule Game Reserve were dropped and incorporated into the Greater Kruger Park with 400,000 hectares added to the Reserve. In 2002, Kruger National Park, Gonarezhou National Park in Zimbabwe, and Limpopo National Park in Mozambique were incorporated into a peace park, the Great Limpopo Transfrontier Park.

In 2009, SANParks envisaged a four-star hotel northeast of Malelane on the bank of the Crocodile River, as part of a survival strategy to make the park less dependent on state subsidies. Eventually Radisson Blu was mandated to operate a 104-room safari resort starting 2019, which promises a smaller ecological footprint than that of prior, existing camps. The three-star, 128-room Skukuza Safari Lodge, to be completed by late 2018, was necessitated by the adjacent Nombolo Mdhluli conference center, opened in 2011, which draws guests arriving by charter flights or in tour busses. Former head of the park Salomon Joubert warned that these developments threaten the character, ethos, and original objectives of the park, but the minister of environmental affairs, Edna Molewa, deemed development of 0.3% of the park as acceptable. The park was temporarily closed due to the COVID-19 pandemic on 25 March 2020. It was reopened on 8 June 2020.

Location and geography 

The park lies in the northeast of South Africa, in the eastern parts of Limpopo and Mpumalanga provinces. Phalaborwa, Limpopo is the only town in South Africa that borders the Kruger National Park.
To the north and south of the park two rivers, the Limpopo and the Crocodile respectively, act as their natural boundaries. To the east, the Lebombo Mountains separate it from Mozambique. Its western boundary runs parallel with this range, roughly  distant. The highest point in the park is here, a hill called Khandzalive. Several rivers run through the park from west to east, including the Sabie, Olifants, Crocodile, Letaba, Luvuvhu and Limpopo Rivers.

Climate 
The climate of the Kruger National Park and lowveld is subtropical/tropical, specifically a hot semi-arid climate (Köppen BSh). Summer days are humid and hot. The rainy season is from September until May. The Kruger National Park website lists September and October as the driest periods, culminating at the beginning of the rainy season late in October. Because the park spans  from north to south, climate can vary throughout the park. Skukuza in the southern part of the park is about  cooler throughout the year than Pafuri in the north, with significantly more rainfall.

Biodiversity

Vegetation 
Plant life consists of four main areas, which correspond roughly to the four quadrants of the park. The main veld types are determined by the rainfall gradient (400 to 750 mm per annum) and geological substrates.

Shrub mopane veld 
Shrub mopane covers almost the entire northeastern part of the park.

Red bush-willow and mopane veld 
This area lies in the park's western half, north of the Olifants River. The two most prominent species here are the red bush-willow (Combretum apiculatum) and the mopane tree (Colophospermum mopane).

Thorn trees and red bush-willow veld 
This area lies between the western boundary and roughly the centre of the park south of the Olifants River. Combretums, such as the red bush-willow (Combretum apiculatum), and Acacia species predominate while there are a great number of marula trees (Sclerocarya caffra). The Acacias are dominant along the rivers and streams, the very dense Nwatimhiri bush along the Sabie River between Skukuza and Lower Sabie being a very good example.

Knob-thorn and marula veld 
South of the Olifants River in the park's eastern half, this area provides the most important grazing land. Species such as red grass (Themeda triandra) and buffalo grass (Panicum maximum) predominate while the knob-thorn (Acacia nigrescens), leadwood (Combretum imberbe) and marula (Sclerocarya caffra) are the main tree species.

Local vegetation communities
Several smaller areas in the park carry distinctive vegetation. The Pretoriuskop sourveld and Malelane mountain bushveld receive relatively high rainfall. Here sickle bush and silver cluster-leaf (Terminalia sericea) are prominent. The sandveld communities northeast of Punda Maria are equally distinctive, with a wide variety of unique plant species. The bush-clad hills along the Levuvhu River also shelter an interesting floral diversity and some near-endemic species.

Mammals 

All the big five game animals are found at Kruger National Park, which has more species of large mammals than any other African game reserve (at 147 species). There are webcams set up to observe the wildlife.

The park stopped culling elephants in 1994 and tried translocating them, but by 2004 the population had increased to 11,670 elephants, by 2006 to approximately 13,500, by 2009 to 11,672, and by 2012 to 16,900. The park's habitats may only be able to sustain about 8,000 elephants, though this is not entirely clear. Elephants change plant growth and density in the park, and some species, such as wildebeests, clearly benefit from increased grasslands.  The park started an attempt at using contraception in 1995 but has stopped that due to problems with delivering the contraceptives and upsetting the herd. The park has taken a firm stance against poaching of all animals, especially the rhinoceros.

Kruger supports packs of the endangered African wild dog, of which there are thought to be only about 400 in the whole of South Africa.

Birds 

A fairly uniform aggregate of bird species is present from the southern to central areas of the park, but a decline in diversity is noticeable in the mopane-dominated flats northwards of the Olifants. Most species breed in summer when rains sustain most vegetable and animal food, but the larger birds of prey conversely breed during the dry winter, when their prey is most exposed. Out of the 517 species of birds found at Kruger, 253 are residents, 117 non-breeding migrants, and 147 are nomads.

Constituting the southern lowveld, the park's avifaunal affinities are mainly with the tropical north. Some representatives of this group are the African openbill, hooded vulture, Dickinson's kestrel, white-crowned lapwing, brown-necked parrot, Senegal coucal, broad-billed roller, trumpeter hornbill, Böhm's spinetail, tropical boubou, Meves's starling and scarlet-chested sunbird. Some 30 waterbird and wader species are dependent on the rivers or associated dams, including the African finfoot, white-backed night heron, white-crowned lapwing and water thick-knee. Other species are limited to riparian thicket or forest, including African goshawk, crested guineafowl, Natal spurfowl, Narina trogon, Pel's fishing owl, bearded scrub robin, terrestrial brownbul and black-throated wattle-eye. This habitat is often reduced by drought or floods or the understorey is opened up by elephant.

Some of the larger birds require large territories or are sensitive to habitat degradation. Six of these birds, which are by and large restricted to Kruger and other extensive conservation areas, have been assigned to a fanciful grouping called the "Big Six Birds". They are the lappet-faced vulture, martial eagle, saddle-billed stork, kori bustard, ground hornbill and the reclusive Pel's fishing owl, which is localized and seldom seen. The 2011 aerial survey found 22 martial eagle nest sites, the 2015 survey an additional 17, while the 2020 survey found 70 nest locations in all, though the activity of these has yet to be determined. There are 25 to 30 breeding pairs of saddle-billed storks in the park, besides a handful of non-breeding individuals. In 2012 178 family groups of ground hornbills roamed the park and 78 nests were known, of which 50% were active. A 2013 study estimated that 904 pairs of white-backed vulture, 78 pairs of lappet-faced vulture and 60 pairs of white-headed vulture breed in the park.

Other vertebrates 
Kruger is inhabited by 126 species of reptile, including black mambas, African rock pythons, and 3,000 Nile crocodiles. As yet, knowledge of the densities and distributions of the reptiles, especially on smaller spatial scales, is limited by sampling bias and a strong dependence on the park's public infrastructure is evident. Thirty-three species of amphibians are found in the park, as well as 50 fish species. A Zambesi shark, Carcharhinus leucas, also known as the bull shark, was caught at the confluence of the Limpopo and Luvuvhu Rivers in July 1950. Zambezi sharks tolerate fresh water and can travel far up rivers like the Limpopo.

Invertebrates 

219 species of butterfly and skipper are native to the park. The fastest and most robust of these belong to the genus Charaxes, of which 12 species have been recorded. Genera Papilio and Acraea are also well-represented, with about 10 and 15 species respectively. The total number of Lepidoptera species in the park is unknown but could be in the order of 7,000, many of which range widely in African savanna. The mopane moth in the northern half of the park is one of the best known, and communities outside the park have at times been given permits to harvest their caterpillars. The park has a high diversity of termites and 22 genera are known to occur, including the mound-building genera Macrotermes, Cubitermes, Amitermes, Odontotermes and Trinervitermes. A new species of woodlouse, Ctenorillo meyeri, has been discovered inside termite nests, east of Phalaborwa and near Mopani Rest Camp. It is the first instance of a termitophilous species from the family Armadillidae. Many species of mosquito occur in the park, including the Culex, Aedes and Anopheles genera which target mammals. A. arabiensis is the most prevalent of the 9 or more Anopheles species in the park, and their females transmit malaria.
As of 2018, 350 species of arachnids, excluding ticks and mites, are known from Kruger. These are mostly true spiders, including 7 species of baboon spider, but also 9 scorpion and 7 pseudoscorpion species, 18 solifugid species (sun and roman spiders), 2 species of harvestmen and 1 species of tailless whip scorpion.

Threats 
The park's ecosystem is subject to several threats, including intensive poaching, urban development at its borders, global warming and droughts, animal overpopulation, and mining projects.

Light pollution produced by rest camps and nearby towns affects the biodiversity of Kruger National Park. In particular, it alters the composition of nocturnal wildlife and the hunting behaviour of predators. In 2022 it was announced that Nkosi City, an R8 billion development is planned near the western border of the park.

Floods or raising of the walls of the Massingir and Corumana dams in Mozambique could potentially damage, by silting, the pristine gorges of the Olifants and Sabie rivers respectively. The Olifants River Gorge has a deep, single thread, pool-rapid structure which is home to many crocodiles, besides hippos and fish. The fish population of the Olifants has already been diminished by hundreds of dams in its upper reaches.

Anti-poaching measures 

Kruger is not exempt from the threat of poaching that many other African countries have faced. Many poachers are in search of ivory from elephant tusks or rhino horns, which are similar in composition to human fingernails. The park's anti-poaching unit consists of 650 SANParks game rangers, assisted by the SAPS and the SANDF (including the SAAF). As of 2013, the park is equipped with two drones borrowed from Denel and two Aérospatiale Gazelle helicopters, donated by the RAF to augment its air space presence. Automated movement sensors relay intrusions along the Mozambique border to a control center, and a specialist dog unit has been introduced. Buffer zones have been established along the border with Mozambique, from where many poachers have infiltrated the park, as an alternative to costly new fences. The original 150 km long fences were dropped in 2002 to establish the Great Limpopo Transfrontier Park. The national anti-poaching committee oversees all activities and coordinates interested parties.

Poachers 
Kruger's big game poachers operate with night vision instruments and large caliber rifles, fitted with suppressors and sophisticated telescopic sights. They are mostly Mozambique citizens that initiate their carefully planned incursions from the border region of South Africa and Mozambique. In 2012 some 200 poachers were apprehended, while about 30 were killed in skirmishes.

In July 2012, a Kruger game ranger and policeman were the first to die in an anti-poaching operation, while other employees reported intimidation by poachers. A Kruger personnel strike affected some anti-poaching operations, and some employees have been directly implicated. Rangers in and around the park have been pressured or blackmailed by poaching syndicates to provide intelligence on the whereabouts of rhinos and anti-poaching operations.

In December 2012, Kruger started using a Seeker II drone against rhino poachers.  The drone was loaned to the South African National Parks authority by its manufacturer Denel Dynamics, South Africa.

In June 2019, a Helix surveillance aircraft system was deployed on night missions in the park, and apprehended half a dozen suspected poachers.

Other threats to poachers include the dangerous nature of the park itself. In February 2018, a poacher was believed to have been trampled by elephants and then eaten by lions, leaving rangers to later find only a human skull and a pair of trousers, alongside a loaded hunting rifle.

In December 2021, two accused poachers were arrested in the Kruger National Park's Skukuza after they were discovered in possession of unauthorized rifles and ammunition.

Rhino 
Poachers make no distinction between white and black rhinos, but losses of black rhinos are low due to their reclusive and aggressive nature. Rhino horn fetches between $66,000 and $82,000 per kilogram, and the CITES ban has proved largely ineffectual against the trade in rhino horn. The second horn is sometimes also hacked from the skull to obtain about 100 ml of moisture that is sold locally as traditional medicine.

Poaching rhino horn escalated in the 21st century, with 949 rhinos killed in Kruger in the first 12 years, and more than 520 in 2013 alone. A memorandum of agreement is seen as a necessary milestone in stemming the tide between South Africa and Vietnam, in addition to the one with China, while negotiations have not yet started with Thailand. The amount of rhino horn held in storage is not publicly known. Since 2009, some Kruger rhinos have been fitted with invisible tracing devices in their bodies and horns which enable officials to locate their carcasses and to track the smuggled horns by satellite. South Africa's 22,000 white and black rhinos represent some 93% of these species' world population, 12,000 of which are found in Kruger.

Elephant 
Kruger experienced significant elephant poaching in the 1980s. Due to international and national efforts, including a worldwide ban on ivory sales beginning in 1989, the poaching was abated for many years, but a sharp rise in 2014 has continued and the numbers of elephants poached per year in the park is growing at an alarming rate.

Following approval by CITES, 47 metric tons of stockpiled ivory from Kruger were auctioned on 6 November 2008. The sale fetched approximately US$6.7 million which was allocated to increased anti-poaching measures. The intention was to flood the market, crash prices and make poaching less profitable. But instead, the legal sale was followed by "an abrupt, significant, permanent, robust and geographically widespread increase" in elephant poaching, as subsequent research showed.

The latest Convention on the International Trade in Endangered Species of Wild Flora and Fauna (CITES), summit voted down proposals for further one-off ivory sales from stockpiles for having led to increases in poaching across the continent. Across the continent the African elephant population decreased 30% in the period between 2007 and 2014.

Other 
It is foreseen that the placement of wire traps to procure meat would eventually become the most challenging form of poaching. A scheme has been proposed to reward adjacent communities with the proceeds of game sales in return for their cooperation in game preservation. The larger communities include Bosbokrand, Acornhoek, Hazyview, Hoedspruit, Komatipoort, Malelane, Marloth Park, Nelspruit and Phalaborwa. Communities along the northern boundary have complained about a number of issues that affect them, including livestock killed by escaped predators. In 2021 and 2022 there were cases of poisoning of carcasses near Punda Maria, evidently to obtain the body parts of scavengers.

Rest camps 

Kruger Park contains twelve main rest camps, as well as several smaller camps scattered throughout the park. There are also several concessions licensed to private companies with their own camps.

The main camps in the park are larger camps containing shops, restaurants or cafeterias, petrol stations, and first aid stations. The largest camp, which also serves as the headquarters for Kruger, is Skukuza.

Skukuza 

Skukuza is the biggest camp in Kruger, as it also contains the administrative headquarters for the park. It is located on the southern bank of the Sabie River 12 km Paul Kruger Gate and 39 km from Phabeni gate. In addition to accommodations, Skukuza contains a conference centre and is a short drive from Skukuza Airport, the only commercial airport in the park.

Berg-en-Dal 

Berg-en-Dal is one of the most accessible camps in Kruger. It is 12 km from Malelane Gate, which is an hour's drive from Mbombela via the N4. The camp contains 69 bungalows which sleep 2–3, 23 family cottages with multiple bedrooms that sleep 4–6, 2 guest houses, and 72 camping or caravan sites. Running along much of the boundary of the camp is the Rhino Trail, a walking trail that takes about an hour to complete. The camp also contains several overlooks and a swimming pool.

Malelane 

Near Berg-en-Dal and the Malelane gate is the small Malelane satellite camp. Featuring 15 tent sites, 4 four-bed rondavels, and 1 three-bed rondavel, Malelane only provides one activity of game drives. Check-in is handled through Malelane Gate.

Crocodile Bridge 

Crocodile Bridge is directly along the southern border of the park near the town of Komatipoort. It is smaller than the other main camps, and as such doesn't have a separate restaurant. The camp also has easy access to the Mozambican border just on the other side of Komatipoort.

Letaba 

Letaba rest camp overlooks a bend in the Letaba River, very close to the geographic centre of the park. Its accommodations include 86 rondavels, 20 furnished tents, 10 six-bed cottages, 5 three-bed huts with communal ablutions, 60 tent or caravan sites, and two large guest houses, the Melville and the Fish Eagle. The Fish Eagle guest house also contains a private bird hide. Letaba also hosts the Elephant Hall, a small museum dedicated to elephants, especially the "Magnificent Seven", elephants of Kruger National Park with unusually large tusks.

Lower Sabie 

Lower Sabie lies about 45 km downstream of Skukuza on the south bank of the Sabie River. It is situated near one of the three bridges to cross the Sabie river in the park (both of the others are near Skukuza). Because of its location, it has large amounts of water, flat plains, and hills easily accessible from the camp.

Mopani 

Mopani sits on the north bank of Pioneer Dam, just south of the Tropic of Capricorn and 50 km north of Letaba. Mopani is also the administrative location of the Shipandani sleep-over bird hides, a hide that can be booked for overnight stays for 2-6 people.

Other camps 

The other main camps are:

 Olifants and its satellite camp Balule
 Orpen and its satellite camps Maroela and Tamboti
 Pretoriuskop
 Punda Maria
 Satara
 Shingwedzi

South African National Parks also manages several bushveld camps: Bataleur, Biyamiti, Shimuwini, Sirheni, and Talamati. Additionally, two overnight hides, Sable Hide, and Shipandani Sleepover Hide can be booked. Several private lodges, including some luxury lodges, are also scattered throughout the park.

Gates to the Kruger Park 

The Kruger Park has the following gates:

Wilderness trails 
Nine different trails are on offer in the Kruger National Park. Some are overnight and they last several days in areas of wilderness virtually untouched by humans. There are no set trails in the wilderness areas; a visitor walks along paths made by animals or seeks out new routes through the bush.

Gallery

See also 

 Kruger to Canyons Biosphere
 Abel Chapman
 Battle at Kruger
 Great Limpopo Transfrontier Park
 Makuleke
 Protected areas of South Africa
 Skukuza
 Kruger National Park in the 1960s (a timeline of events)
 Sabi Sand Game Reserve
 SanWild Wildlife Sanctuary

References

Further reading

External links 

 
 Webcams in the Kruger

 
Protected areas established in 1926
National parks of South Africa
Protected areas of Limpopo
Protected areas of Mpumalanga
Border barriers
1926 establishments in South Africa
Zambezian and mopane woodlands